Maria Carla Bresciani (born 16 July 1973) is a former Italian female pole vaulter who won nine national championships at individual senior level from 1995 to 2004.

Biography
In the early 1990s, Bresciani was a pioneer of the specialty of the pole vault that was born at the female level in those years throughout the world. Her best result on the international senior level was the final reached in the pole vault at the 1997 IAAF World Indoor Championships held in Paris.

She is the wife of the former pole vaulter Fabio Pizzolato.

National record
 Long jump: 4.06 m (Turin, 14 September 1996), her last of 13 Record was broken by Francesca Dolcini on 8 February 1998 with 4.10 m.

Achievements

National titles
Italian Athletics Championships
Pole vault: 1995, 1997, 1999, 2001, 2004 (5)
Italian Athletics Indoor Championships
Pole vault: 1995, 1996, 1997, 2003 (4)

References

External links
 

1973 births
Living people
Italian female pole vaulters
Athletics competitors of Fiamme Oro